Jean Denis may refer to:

Jean Denis (politician) (1902–1992), Belgian politician and writer
Jean-Denis, a given name